is a Japanese manga series by Hidekichi Matsumoto. It has been serialized online via Matsumoto's Twitter account, as well as pixiv Comic website, since 2017 and has been collected in six tankōbon volumes by Kodansha. The manga is licensed in North America by Vertical. An anime television series adaptation by Team Till Dawn aired from October 2, 2020, to March 27, 2021, on the Super Animeism block.

Characters

Media

Manga

Anime
An anime adaptation was announced via Twitter on December 8, 2019. The television series is animated by Team Till Dawn, with Seiji Kishi directing and writing the series, Kazuaki Morita designing the characters, and TAKAROT composing the series' music.  It aired from October 2, 2020, to March 27, 2021, on the Super Animeism block on MBS, TBS, BS-TBS, and other channels.  Ayaka Ōhashi will perform the series' theme song  "Nyan Daa Wan Daa Days", as well as the series' second theme song "Lovely Days".  The series ran for 24 episodes. Each episode is approximately 2 minutes in length.

References

External links
Anime official website 

Anime series based on manga
Animeism
Japanese webcomics
Kodansha manga
Shōjo manga
Vertical (publisher) titles
Webcomics in print